Mohammad Shahr (Mahdasht) Metro Station, formerly simply known as Mahdasht Metro Station is a station in Tehran Metro Line 5. It is located in southern Karaj. It is between Karaj Metro Station and Golshahr Metro Station.

References

Tehran Metro stations